Blon or Blon' is a settlement in Belarus.

Blon or Blon' may also refer to:
Blon, a villain in the list of Blame! characters
Blon Fel-Fotch Pasameer-Day Slitheen, a criminal character from Doctor Who TV series

See also
 
Le Blon (disambiguation)
Franz von Blon, German composer and bandmaster
Blons